Société nationale des constructions aéronautiques du Midi (abbreviated SNCAM) was a state-owned French aircraft manufacturer. The company was formed following the resolution of the 1936 general strike of French heavy industry, when the government of Léon Blum introduced an act to nationalize the French war industry on or before April 1, 1937. The former Dewoitine aircraft company was placed under government control, and renamed SNCAM. The company had been formed as one of six state-owned Société Nationales in the 1936 nationalistation of military industries, in late 1940 these were re-organised and SNCAM was absorbed by SNCASE. SNCASE later merged with SNCASO to form Sud Aviation. Through subsequent mergers, SNCAM's former holdings are now part of the EADS group.

Products
Dewoitine D.520

References

Defunct aircraft manufacturers of France
Vehicle manufacturing companies established in 1937
Manufacturing companies disestablished in 1957
Defence companies of France
French companies established in 1937
1957 disestablishments in France
Manufacturing companies based in Toulouse